On 13 June 2021 a gas explosion took place at about 6:30 a.m. local time in Yanhu Community, Checheng Road Subdistrict, Zhangwan District, Shiyan, Hubei in a market, which then collapsed. Locals who were buying vegetables or having breakfast at the market were trapped by the explosion. The explosion resulted in 25 deaths and 138 injuries (including 37 serious injuries).

Accident
At 6:30 a.m. a gas line exploded near a vegetable market killing 25 and injuring 138. 173 firefighters rescued 150 from building severely damaged by the blast.

Casualties
25 people were killed and 138 others injured, according to CGTN.

See also
List of pipeline accidents

References

Explosions in 2021
2021 disasters in China
2021 in the environment
2021 industrial disasters
Explosions in China
History of Hubei
June 2021 events in China
Pipeline accidents
Zhangwan District